J Huber "Hube" Wagner (January 5, 1891 – March 1979) was an American football player who played college football at the University of Pittsburgh from 1910 until 1913. Prior to arriving at Pitt, Wagner had been hailed by the media for being one of Pennsylvania's most versatile football players while performing at Monaca High School. He soon made Pitt's varsity squad as a freshman, playing end. That season Pitt posted a 9–0 record. Because of Hube's ability to play virtually any position, Pitt's coach Joe Thompson developed him into a utility player. Although Wagner was primarily used as an end, Thompson used him at every other position except quarterback. In 1913, Wagner captained the Pitt team and received All-American honors.

After graduation, he became a prominent surgeon in Pittsburgh until his retirement in 1975. Hube served twelve years on Pitt’s Board of Trustees. In 1915 he was recruited by Jack Cusack, the manager of the Canton Bulldogs to play for the Bulldogs against their rivals the Massillon Tigers. He was elected to the College Football Hall of Fame in 1973.

References
Beaver County Sportsman's Hall of Fame

1891 births
1979 deaths
American football ends
Canton Bulldogs (Ohio League) players
Pittsburgh Panthers football players
College Football Hall of Fame inductees
People from Monaca, Pennsylvania
Physicians from Pennsylvania
Players of American football from Pennsylvania